Oleg Normatov (born September 4, 1981 in Tashkent) is an Uzbekistani sprint hurdler. Normatov represented Uzbekistan at the 2008 Summer Olympics in Beijing, where he competed for the 110 m hurdles. He ran in the first heat against six other athletes, including Cuban sprint hurdler and world-record holder Dayron Robles, who eventually won the gold medal in the final. He finished the sprint race in sixth place by one tenths of a second behind Russia's Evgeniy Borisov, with a time of 14.00 seconds. Normatov, however, failed to advance into the quarterfinals, as he placed thirty-eighth overall, and was ranked below four mandatory slots for the next round.

References

External links

NBC Olympics Profile

Uzbekistani male hurdlers
Living people
Olympic athletes of Uzbekistan
Athletes (track and field) at the 2008 Summer Olympics
Sportspeople from Tashkent
1981 births